Ava Grace Kolker (born December 5, 2006) is an American child actress. Kolker's roles include Ava Morgenstern on the Disney Channel series Girl Meets World (2014–2017), and Olive Rozalski on Sydney to the Max (2019–2021). In film, she portrayed Lily in Scary Movie 5 (2013), Heather in Miss Meadows (2014), Boot in Message from the King (2016) and Young Elise Rainer in Insidious: The Last Key (2018).

Early life 
Kolker was born in Los Angeles, California then moved one year to Florida. She has three sisters, Kayla Kolker, Jade Kolker and Lexy Kolker, also an actress, who is best known for playing Chloe in the 2018 horror film Freaks.

Career

2011–2014: Early roles 
Kolker began acting in 2011 at a young age, making her debut with a guest appearance on the television horror series American Horror Story. A year later, she appeared in her first film, starring as Marybeth Geitzen in the comedy film Golden Winter.

In 2013, she was cast as Lily in the comedy horror film Scary Movie 5, the final installment in the Scary Movie film series, which was commercially successful. and in the same year appeared in the drama film The Trials of Cate McCall as Augie. In 2014, she played Heather in the thriller film Miss Meadows.

2015–present: Breakthrough and current work 
Kolker has made various guest appearances on television series such as Dads, Sam & Cat, and Black-ish. In 2015, Kolker was cast in the recurring role of Ava Morgenstern on Disney Channel's comedy television series Girl Meets World, the spinoff to Boy Meets World. For the role, she received a Young Artist Award nomination. In the year following, she appeared in the horror film The Axe Murders of Villisca as Ingrid, the action film Message from the King as Boot, and the drama television film Sister Cities as Young Austin.

In 2017, Kolker made guest appearances on the comedy series White Famous as Maddie, and the superhero series Agents of S.H.I.E.L.D. as 12-year old Robin, portraying an older version of the character who was played by her sister Lexy as an 8-year old. In 2018, Kolker was cast on the Disney Channel sitcom Sydney to the Max, playing the main character of Olive. In the same year, she appeared as Young Elise Rainier in the film Insidious: The Last Key, the fourth film in the Insidious franchise. The film was a commercial success. She also starred as Aeloo in the fantasy film A Fairy's Game.

In 2019, she was cast in a minor voice role in the film Red Shoes and the Seven Dwarfs, which will be released theatrically in September 2020. Kolker released her debut single, "The Good Ones" in July 2019. In 2020, she released the follow-up singles "Eventually" and "When Will It Be Tomorrow"; the latter of which was released through Vevo.

Filmography

Awards and nominations

References

External links 
 

2006 births
Living people
American child actresses
American film actresses
American television actresses
21st-century American actresses
Actresses from California